The Tutor of History is a novel by Nepalese-Canadian writer Manjushree Thapa. It was published in 2001 by Penguin Books. The book is considered one of the first books written by a Nepalese writer in English.

It is the first novel of the writer who had previously written a non-fiction book called Mustang Bhot in Fragments published in 1992.

Synopsis 
The book is set in 1990s Nepal. The main plot of the book is centered around the  campaign for parliamentary elections in the roadside town of Khaireni Tar, situated between Kathmandu and Pokhara in the western region of Nepal. The book shows the effect of the elections on the common people of that town and the lives of the people gets entangled with the politics.

Characters 
The major characters of the novel are :

 Giridhar Adhikari -Chairman of the People's Party's district committee
 Rishi Parajuli - A under-employed bachelor, UML member and a tutor to school children
 Om Gurung - A former British Gurkha 
 Binita Dahal - A young widow who owns a small tea shop

Reception 
Renowned writer Indra Bahadur Rai in his review for Nepali Times lauded the novel and said, " She will be a recurrent success story" about Thapa. Sarah LeVine praised the book as providing "modern perspective" to Nepal in her review for the journal European Bullet for Himalayan Research.

See also 

 Arresting God in Kathmandu
 Tilled Earth
Forget Kathmandu
 Unleashing Nepal

References 

Nepalese books
English books by Nepalese writer
2001 novels
21st-century Nepalese books
21st-century Nepalese novels
2001 Nepalese novels
Nepalese literature in English
Novels set in Nepal
Nepalese political novels